Anna Wagner Keichline (May 24, 1889 – February 5, 1943) was an American architect, inventor, suffragist, and World War I Special Agent from Pennsylvania. She was the first woman to be registered as an architect in Pennsylvania and she was "one of the first women to actually practice architecture professionally". She was awarded seven patents, including one for a notched brick in 1927.

Early life
Keichline was the youngest of four children, born in Bellefonte, Pennsylvania to attorney John Keichline. Her parents gave her a workshop and carpentry tools, which she used to create furniture. She won a prize for a table and chest she made at a county fair in 1903, when she was 14, and her work was praised as comparing "favorably with the work of a skilled mechanic". She told a newspaper reporter that she expected to devote her life to industrial design. She graduated from Bellefonte High School in 1906. She studied mechanical engineering for a year at Pennsylvania State College, the only woman in her class, and moved to Cornell University, graduating in 1911, their fifth female to receive an architecture degree. She played basketball at Cornell, served as class officer, and was a sorority and drama club member.
Keichline was definitely aware of the disadvantage and difficulty being a woman in architecture – a male-dominated field – but she was not discouraged. She was convinced that women could be just as successful because of their innate understanding of space in a home.

Inventions
She became noted for working on "time- and motion-saving" design of kitchens and interiors. She owned seven patents. She had several inventions concerning home use, but her most noted invention was the "K Brick" in 1927. This type of hollow clay brick was less heavy and expensive than previous iterations and was an early form of the concrete block used in construction decades later. This led to her receiving honors from the American Ceramic Society in 1931.

Her first patent combined a sink and a washtub. She wanted to save space in kitchens and make them more comfortable to use. In 1924 she received a patent on one of her kitchen designs. Features of Keichline's kitchen-construction patent include an oven with a fireless cooker on one side and a steam cooker on the other side, which is located behind the cooking surface. The design was focused on "comfort and convenience, efficiency, and conservation of space." This kitchen featured sloped countertops and cabinets with glass doors. In 1929 she received a patent on an apartment bed design. It could be flipped into the wall to save space.

Her most famous invention was the K Brick, which lead to the development of the concrete block. It was patented in 1927 and she was honored for it by the American Ceramic Society in 1931. The K Brick was made of clay and used for hollow wall construction. It can be described as an inexpensive, light, fireproof clay brick that could be filled with insulating or sound-proofing material. Keichline noted that her K Brick, “requires less to make than brick and because of its design takes less time to fire – the tile would reduce the weight of the wall by one-half.”

Patents
 Sink for Apartments (1912)
 Toy (1916)
 Components for Kitchen Construction (1926)
 K Brick (1927)
 Child's Portable Partition (1927)
 Folding Bed for Apartments (1929)
 Air System (1931)

Architecture
Throughout her professional career, she designed seven patents that had great impact on day-to-day life. She also designed commercial buildings and homes in Pennsylvania, Ohio, and Washington, D.C. She was honored in 2002 with in an official state of Pennsylvania historical marker placed in front of the Plaza Theater, which she designed in 1925. Also, her great niece, Nancy Perkins carried on her legacy by establishing her own industrial design firm, Perkins Design Ltd. Keichline's designs can still be seen in Bellefonte, Mill Hall, Centre Hall, Huntingdon and Mount Union, PA. She designed the Plaza Theatre, the Cadillac Garage and Apartments, the Harvey Apartments, as well as multiple residences in Bellefonte.

Personal life
Keichline had her own automobile, which was unusual for women at the time. She was also involved in World War I efforts, serving as a "special agent with military intelligence." She was a delegate to President Hoover's Better Housing Conference. On July 4, 1913 she led a march in Bellefonte of Suffragists during nationally organized protests.

Publications
Keichline has been mentioned in many publications. Her career and professional practices are discussed in Goddess in the Details: product design by women, written by Erika Doering, Rachel Sivitzky, Rebecca Welz, and published by Association of Women Industrial Designers (AWID) in 1994. The book is published in conjunction with an exhibition organized by The Association of Women Industrial Designers and the Department of Exhibitions at Pratt Institute.

Keichline's achievements are also discussed in The patents of a design pioneer: Anna Wagner Keichline, written by Nancy J Perkins, published by Innovation in 1991. This publication outlined the profile of Keichline as an American pioneer industrial designer and architect; also emphasizes Keichline's four design patents awarded for multiple-use - a kitchen sink (1912), kitchen 'units' (1926), a folding bed for apartments (1929) and the 'K Brick Building Block' (1927).

World War I Involvements
During World War I, Keichline served as a Special Agent in the Military Intelligence Division in Washington D.C. When talking about her qualifications for this duty she described herself as, ...twenty-eight and physically somewhat stronger than the average. Might add that I can operate and take care of a car [she owned her own automobile]. The above might suggest a drafting or office job, but if you should deem it advisable to give me something more difficult or as I wish to say more dangerous, I should much prefer it. You have asked for my salary in order to rate me. ...last year my fees amounted to something over six thousand.Today her fees amounted to over $92,000 and she received letters from her superiors for the quality of her service.

Legacy 
Keichline died on February 5, 1943. A small collection of her papers, including a copy of an article written by her, "Modern Wall Construction" from the 1932 issue of The Clay-Worker, as well as designs and drawings are collected at International Archive of Women in Architecture, located at Newman Library, Virginia Tech. In 2002, Keichline's niece, Nancy Perkins, donated additional collection to IAWA, which includes a CD-ROM documenting Keichline's life and achievements.

References

External links
Pioneering Women of American Architecture, Anna Wagner Keichline

1889 births
1943 deaths
20th-century American architects
Women inventors
People from Bellefonte, Pennsylvania
American women architects
Cornell University College of Architecture, Art, and Planning alumni
20th-century American inventors
20th-century American women